Mathieu Cachbach (born 23 May 2001) is a Belgian professional footballer who plays as a midfielder for Seraing.

Club career
On 31 August 2022, Cachbach returned to Seraing on a permanent basis and signed a two-year contract.

Honours 
Metz B
 Championnat National 3: 2019–20

References 

2001 births
Living people
People from Arlon
Belgian footballers
Association football midfielders
FC Metz players
R.F.C. Seraing (1922) players
Championnat National 3 players
Championnat National 2 players
Belgian Pro League players
Ligue 2 players
Belgian expatriate footballers
Expatriate footballers in France
Belgian expatriate sportspeople in France
Footballers from Luxembourg (Belgium)